Minggugong station, is a station of Line 2 of the Nanjing Metro. It started operations on 28 May 2010 along with the rest of Line 2.

The station is traditionally decorated using red and yellow and has a theme of Double Ninth Festival.

Around the station 
 Ming Palace
 Nanjing Museum

References 

Railway stations in Jiangsu
Railway stations in China opened in 2010
Nanjing Metro stations